There are two species of agama named lined earless dragon:

 Tympanocryptis lineata
 Tympanocryptis petersi